Amphidromus daoae is a species of medium-sized air-breathing tree snail, an arboreal gastropod mollusk in the family Camaenidae.

Distribution 
Amphidromus daoae is found in Đắk Lắk Province, Central Vietnam.

Habitat 
It is found on the ground, among leaf litter.

Etymology 
This species is named after Lê Vũ Hồng Đào for providing the type material.

References

daoae
Gastropods described in 2016